Rexhep Maçi (1912–1980) was an Albanian football player who played for SK Tirana during the 1930 season, which was the first ever championship in Albanian football history, where he won the Kategoria superiore and where he also won the first ever golden boot in Albanian history after scoring 3 goals in the 1930 championship.

SK Tirana 
He featured in the 1st ever Albanian football championship, the Kategoria superiore 1930, a competition which he also won for the very first time in 1930. He was the joint top scorer of the competition in 1930 alongside teammate Emil Hajnali with 3 goals in a possible 10 games. With SK Tirana he managed to win 1 championship title, which was the first ever one in 1930. He also played for Skënderbeu and Besa Kavajë.

Honours
Albanian Superliga: 1
 1930

References 

1912 births
1980 deaths
Association football forwards
Albanian footballers
KF Tirana players
KF Skënderbeu Korçë players
Besa Kavajë players